Severiano may refer to:

Severiano Álvarez (1933–2013), Leonese language writer
Severiano Ballesteros (1957–2011), Spanish professional golfer, a World No. 1
Severiano Sainz y Bencamo (1871–1937), the second Bishop of the Roman Catholic Diocese of Matanzas (1915–1937)
Severiano de Heredia (1836–1901), Cuban-born biracial politician, a freemason, a left-wing republican, naturalized as French in 1870
Lauro Severiano Muller (1863–1926), Brazilian politician, diplomat, and military engineer
Nuno Severiano Teixeira (born 1957), Portuguese politician

See also
Severiano de Almeida, municipality in the state Rio Grande do Sul, Brazil
Estádio Severiano Gomes Filho, also known as Estádio Pajuçara, is a multi-use stadium in Pajuçara neighborhood, Maceió, Brazil
Severiano Melo, municipality in the state of Rio Grande do Norte in the Northeast region of Brazil
Doutor Severiano, municipality in the state of Rio Grande do Norte in the Northeast region of Brazil
Estádio General Severiano, football stadium located in Rio de Janeiro, Brazil
Severian
Severino